Worst Fears Confirmed is the second album by Chicago rapper Vakill, released January 31, 2006 on Molemen Records. The album comes three years after the rapper's 2003 debut The Darkest Cloud. Like his debut, Worst Fears Confirmed was widely acclaimed by many sources. Allmusic reviewer Jason Ankeny gave the album a 4½ star rating, calling it a "Chicago hip-hop masterpiece" with "dazzling lyrical intelligence" [].

The album is produced by Molemen members Panik and Memo and UK producer Chemo, and features guest appearances from Ras Kass, Royce da 5'9" and Vizion.

Track listing

References

2006 albums
Vakill albums